Hans-Werner Hartl (born 10 November 1946) is a retired German footballer.

Club statistics

References

External links
 

1946 births
Living people
German footballers
Bundesliga players
2. Bundesliga players
VfL Bochum players
Borussia Dortmund players
SG Union Solingen players

Association football midfielders